Danielle Byrnes (born 29 March 1987) is an Australian model and actress. She was the winner of Miss International Australia with the world final to be held in Japan. She represented Australia in China and Hong Kong in November and December 2007 for the Miss Model of the World Finals. She placed 6th out of 65 worldwide contestants. Not long after, she won Miss Global Beauty in Australia and claimed 7th place in the World Final in Shanghai, China. Danielle claimed the title of Miss Bikini World Australia in Manly. She has been modelling since 2005.

Personal life
Danielle grew up in Sydney but after living in Japan, Thailand, and China, she is now based on the Gold Coast, in Queensland, Australia, where she is a full-time model. She became engaged to long time boyfriend Tim Slade in October, 2018.

Modelling
Danielle does photographic, catwalk, and brand ambassador work. She specialises in fashion, bikini, lingerie, portrait, and fitness photography. She is the face of Underwear of Sweden, Stepanka Swimwear, Dinaela Brazilian Bikinis, and All Bets.

External links
 Official Website

Actresses from Sydney
Actresses from the Gold Coast, Queensland
Australian female models
1987 births
Living people
Miss International 2007 delegates